Patrick López (born 17 March 1978) is a Venezuelan professional boxer. As an amateur, he competed at the 2000 and 2004 Summer Olympics. He also won gold medals at the Pan American Games, Central American and Caribbean Games and South American Games.

Amateur career
López is a southpaw who won the 2002 Central American and Caribbean Games and the 2003 Pan American Games.

Olympic results
He represented his country at two consecutive Summer Olympics, starting in 2000 in Sydney, Australia.
2000 Sydney (as a Lightweight)
Defeated Norman Schuster (Germany) 24-10
Lost to Alexandr Maletin (Russia) RSC 3

2004 Athens (as a Light Welterweight)
Lost to Michele di Rocco (Italy) 30-37

Professional career
Nicknamed El Elegante he turned professional on 13 December 2004.

Professional record

|- style="margin:0.5em auto; font-size:95%;"
|align="center" colspan=8|21 Wins (13 knockouts, 8 decisions), 6 Losses (2 knockouts, 4 decisions), 0 Draw|- style="margin:0.5em auto; font-size:95%;"
|align=center style="border-style: none none solid solid; background: #e3e3e3"|Res.|align=center style="border-style: none none solid solid; background: #e3e3e3"|Record|align=center style="border-style: none none solid solid; background: #e3e3e3"|Opponent|align=center style="border-style: none none solid solid; background: #e3e3e3"|Type|align=center style="border-style: none none solid solid; background: #e3e3e3"|Rd., Time|align=center style="border-style: none none solid solid; background: #e3e3e3"|Date|align=center style="border-style: none none solid solid; background: #e3e3e3"|Location|align=center style="border-style: none none solid solid; background: #e3e3e3"|Notes'''
|-align=center
|-align=center
|Win || 21-5-0 ||align=left| Eugenio Lopez
||| 4,1:15||   || align=left| 
|align=left|
|-align=center
|Loss || 20-5-0 ||align=left| Karim Mayfield
||| 10||   || align=left| 
|align=left|
|-align=center
|Loss || 20-4-0 ||align=left| Henry Lundy
||| 10||   || align=left| 
|align=left|
|-align=center
|Loss || 20-3-0 ||align=left| Tim Coleman
||| 3,2:13 ||   || align=left| 
|align=left|
|-align=center
|Win|| 20-2-0 ||align=left| Prenice Brewer
||| 3,2:38 ||   || align=left| 
|align=left|
|-align=center
|Win|| 19-2-0 ||align=left| Cristian Favela
||| 8 ||   || align=left| 
|align=left|
|-align=center
|Win|| 18-2-0 ||align=left| John Brown
||| 8 ||   || align=left| 
|align=left|
|-align=center
|Win|| 17-2-0 ||align=left| Sergio Rivera
||| 8 ||   || align=left| 
|align=left|
|-align=center
|Win|| 16-2-0 ||align=left| Tyler Ziolkowski
||| 1,2:16 ||   || align=left| 
|align=left|
|-align=center
|Loss|| 15-2-0 ||align=left| Josesito Lopez
||| 8 ||   || align=left| 
|align=left|
|-align=center
|Win|| 15-1-0 ||align=left| Jailer Berrio
||| 8 ||   || align=left| 
|align=left|
|-align=center
|Win|| 14-1-0 ||align=left| Doel Carrasquillo
||| 6 ||   || align=left| 
|align=left|
|-align=center
|Win|| 13-1-0 ||align=left| Juaquin Gallardo
||| 10 ||   || align=left| 
|align=left|
|-align=center
|Win|| 12-1-0 ||align=left| Jonathan Tubbs
||| 4,2:04 ||   || align=left| 
|align=left|
|-align=center
|Loss|| 11-1-0 ||align=left| Fernando Angulo
||| 10 ||   || align=left| 
|align=left|
|-align=center
|Win|| 11-0-0 ||align=left| Sebastien Hamel
||| 2,3:00 ||   || align=left| 
|align=left|
|-align=center
|Win|| 10-0-0 ||align=left| Jose Badillo
||| 3,2:24 ||   || align=left| 
|align=left|
|-align=center
|Win|| 9-0-0 ||align=left| Agustin Velez
||| 6,2:54 ||   || align=left| 
|align=left|
|-align=center
|Win|| 8-0-0 ||align=left| Eric Rodriguez
||| 6 ||   || align=left| 
|align=left|
|-align=center
|Win|| 7-0-0 ||align=left| Armando Cordoba
||| 4 ||   || align=left| 
|align=left|
|-align=center
|Win|| 6-0-0 ||align=left| Franchie Torres
||| 6,1:40 ||   || align=left| 
|align=left|
|-align=center
|Win|| 5-0-0 ||align=left| Christian Lozada
||| 1,2:46 ||   || align=left| 
|align=left|
|-align=center
|Win|| 4-0-0 ||align=left| Diego Villalba
||| 3,2:36 ||   || align=left| 
|align=left|
|-align=center
|Win|| 3-0-0 ||align=left| Ahmed Curry
||| 3,1:48 ||   || align=left| 
|align=left|
|-align=center
|Win|| 2-0-0 ||align=left| Edwin Mota
||| 3,2:10 ||   || align=left| 
|align=left|
|-align=center
|Win|| 1-0-0 ||align=left| Jose Luis Gil Atencio
||| 1 ||   || align=left| 
|align=left|

References
 
 sports-reference

1978 births
Living people
Light-welterweight boxers
Boxers at the 1999 Pan American Games
Boxers at the 2000 Summer Olympics
Boxers at the 2003 Pan American Games
Boxers at the 2004 Summer Olympics
Olympic boxers of Venezuela
Venezuelan male boxers
Pan American Games gold medalists for Venezuela
Pan American Games bronze medalists for Venezuela
Pan American Games medalists in boxing
Central American and Caribbean Games gold medalists for Venezuela
Competitors at the 2002 Central American and Caribbean Games
South American Games gold medalists for Venezuela
South American Games medalists in boxing
Competitors at the 2002 South American Games
Central American and Caribbean Games medalists in boxing
Medalists at the 1999 Pan American Games
Medalists at the 2003 Pan American Games
People from Cojedes (state)
21st-century Venezuelan people